The 2022 United States Senate election in Florida was held on November 8, 2022, to elect a member of the United States Senate to represent the state of Florida.

Incumbent Republican Senator Marco Rubio won re-election to a third term, defeating Democratic nominee Val Demings. Rubio was first elected in 2010, filling the seat of appointed Senator George LeMieux. The primary elections for Republicans and Democrats took place on August 23 to finalize candidates for the November election. Rubio won the uncontested Republican primary, while incumbent U.S. Representative Val Demings won the Democratic nomination. Rubio became the first Republican to win re-election to a third term in Florida history. This is the latest election in which Miami-Dade County voted for a Republican nominee for Senate, the last time being in 2010, when Marco Rubio ran for his first term.

Republican primary

Candidates

Nominee
Marco Rubio, incumbent U.S. senator

Did not qualify 
Kevin DePuy, former Marine Corps sergeant
Howard Knepper, businessman and perennial candidate (ran as a write-in candidate)
Jake Loubriel, Florida National Guardsman
Ervan Katari Miller, perennial candidate
Earl Yearicks IV, maritime captain

Withdrawn 
 Calvin Driggers, businessman
Luis Miguel, conservative writer and activist (ran for State House)
Angela Walls-Windhauser, perennial candidate

Declined
Pam Bondi, former Florida attorney general
Matt Gaetz, U.S. representative (ran for re-election)
Roger Stone, political consultant
Donald Trump, former president of the United States (endorsed Rubio)
Ivanka Trump, former advisor to the President
Michael Waltz, U.S. representative (ran for re-election)
Brian Mast, U.S. representative (ran for re-election)

Endorsements

Democratic primary

Candidates

Nominee
 Val Demings, U.S. representative

Eliminated in primary
 Ricardo de la Fuente, perennial candidate and son of Rocky de la Fuente
 Brian Rush, former Minority Whip of the Florida House of Representatives
William Sanchez, immigration lawyer and former special counsel for the U.S. Department of Justice

Did not qualify 
Edward Abud, businessman
 Al Fox, president of the Alliance for Responsible Cuba Policy Foundation
Dana Harshman, pharmacist
 Josue Larose, perennial candidate
 Coleman Watson, federal attorney and stroke survivor
Joshua Weil, teacher

Withdrawn 
Alan Grayson, former U.S. representative and candidate in 2016 (ran for U.S. House)
 Ilya Katz, Loyola University Chicago professor
Ken Russell, Miami City Commissioner (ran for U.S. House)
Allek Pastrana, engineer (ran for U.S. House)

Declined
Aramis Ayala, former state attorney for the Ninth Judicial Circuit Court of Florida (2017–2021) (ran for Attorney General)
Charlie Crist, U.S. representative, former Governor of Florida, candidate for U.S. Senate in 2010, and nominee for governor in 2014 (ran for governor)
Ted Deutch, U.S. representative
Anna Eskamani, state representative
Nikki Fried, Florida commissioner of agriculture (ran for governor)
Stephanie Murphy, U.S. representative
Gwen Graham, Assistant Secretary of Education for Legislation and Congressional Affairs, former U.S. representative, and candidate for governor in 2018
Debbie Mucarsel-Powell, former U.S. representative

Endorsements

Polling

Results

Independent and third-party candidates

Libertarian Party

Candidates

Qualified 
 Dennis Misigoy, former chairman of the Enclave at Black Point Community Development District board of supervisors (2016–2021)

Unity Party

Candidates

Did not file 
 Shantele Bennett, financial advisor and candidate for mayor of Orlando in 2019

Independent candidates

Candidates

Declared 
Steven B. Grant, former mayor of Boynton Beach (2016–2022)
 Quoc Tuan Nguyen, Florida Institute of Technology professor

Did not qualify 
Carlos Barberena, digital marketing consultant

Did not file 
Grace Granda, business consultant

Withdraw 
Jason Holic, businessman

Declined 
David Jolly, chairman of Serve America Movement and former U.S. representative
 John Morgan, attorney and medical marijuana advocate
Joe Scarborough, MSNBC host and former U.S. representative

Write-ins

Candidates

Declared 
Uloma Uma Expete
Howard Knepper, businessman and perennial candidate 
Moses Quiles, security technician
Edward Gray
Salomon Hernandez Sr.
Jay An

General election

Predictions

Endorsements

Polling
Aggregate polls

Graphical summary
 

Marco Rubio vs. Aramis Ayala

Marco Rubio vs. Alan Grayson

Marco Rubio vs. Stephanie Murphy

Marco Rubio vs. generic Democrat

Debates

Results

Voter demographics

See also
 Elections in Florida
 Political party strength in Florida
 Florida Democratic Party
 Florida Republican Party
 Government of Florida
 2022 United States House of Representatives elections in Florida
 2022 Florida gubernatorial election
2022 Florida House of Representatives election
 2022 Florida Senate election
 2022 Florida elections
2022 United States gubernatorial elections
 2022 United States elections

Notes

Partisan clients

References

External links 

 Florida Division of Elections Candidate Tracking System
Official campaign websites
 Carlos Barberena (I) for Senate
 Val Demings (D) for Senate
 Steven B. Grant (I) for Senate
 Dennis Misigoy (L) for Senate
 Quoc Tuan Nguyen (IP) for Senate
 Marco Rubio (R) for Senate

Marco Rubio
2022
Florida
United States Senate